Rosalinda Cannavò (born 26 November 1992) is an Italian actress and singer.

Early life and career 
After initially approaching dance, at the age of 16 she made her debut as an actress. After moving to Rome, she attends acting and diction courses. In 2012 she made her debut on the small screen, under the pseudonym of Adua Del Vesco, in the third season of the fiction L'onore e il rispetto, directed by Alessio Inturri and Luigi Parisi. The pseudonym chosen originated from the fictional name of one of the protagonists of I colori della vita, a 2005 miniseries.

In January 2014 she made her debut with the film Sapore di te, directed by Carlo Vanzina. In the same year she returned to the small screen with the second season of Il peccato e la vergogna, directed by Alessio Inturri, Luigi Parisi and Mariano Lamberti, with the two-part miniseries Rodolfo Valentino - La leggenda, directed by Alessio Inturri, and with Furore, directed by Alessio Inturri.

In 2016 she starred in the TV series Non è stato mio figlio, directed by Alessio Inturri and Luigi Parisi, and Il bello delle donne... alcuni anni dopo, directed by Eros Puglielli. In the same year she made her debut as a singer with the singles "Magico" and "Non c'è sole".

In 2018 she was again on the small screen with Furore - Capitolo Secondo, directed by Alessio Inturri. In the same year she returned to the cinema playing a young Veronica Lario in the film Loro by Paolo Sorrentino. On 30 December 2018 Adua launched the single "Sei Sei Sei", a song written by Teodosio Losito, accompanied by a music video directed by Luigi Parisi.

Between 2020 and 2021 she was among the competitors of the fifth edition of the "Grande Fratello VIP", conducted by  Alfonso Signorini, broadcast on 
Canale 5, during which she decides to give up the pseudonym of Adua Del Vesco to return to her real name, Rosalinda Cannavò; she ranked seventh, being eliminated during the semi-final on televoting against Stefania Orlando.

She considers herself Roman Catholic.

Filmography

Films

Television

References

External links

1992 births
Living people
Italian film actresses
Italian stage actresses
Italian television actresses
Italian women singers
People from Messina
Mass media people from Sicily
21st-century Italian actresses
Italian Roman Catholics